The Last Viking is a Danish-Swedish children's film released in 1997 and directed by Jesper W. Nielsen. The film stars Holger Thaarup, Kim Bodnia and Per Oscarsson.

Plot
A Viking boy, Harald dreams of becoming a warrior like his father Agne. King Grimnir imposes new taxes to collect from the people. However, chieftain Agne refuses to surrender his city's ships to the king and cooperates with the rebels. The king's soldiers soon come to raid the village. The village is set on fire, some of the inhabitants are killed and the rest taken prisoner, and they are ordered to build a new ship for the king's fleet. Harald and the dwarf Gunga go to great lengths to get the city's drunken ship craftsman to complete the ship.

Cast
Cast adapted from the Danish Film Database.
 Holger Thaarup as Harald 	
  as Bjarke 	
 Moa Lagercrantz as Eisa 	
 Bjørn Floberg as Thorgrim 	
 Kim Bodnia as Sigbard 	
 Erik Wedersøe as Agne
 Per Oscarsson as Skrælling 	
 Ricky Danielsson as Gunga 	
 Bjarne Henriksen as Svarre 	
  as Skjalden 	
 Elo Sjøgren as Hofsnog 	
  as Hirdmand 	
 Peeter Kard as Høvding

Release
The Last Viking was distributed in Danish cinemas by Zentropa from 17 January 1997.

Reception
The Swedish Nöjesguiden said The Last Viking does most things wrong, describing the story as unfocused and infantile and the dialogue as poorly crafted. The critic compared the acting to amateur theatre from the 1960s, with the exception of Per Oscarsson's "mumbling and swearing".

References

External links
 
 Den Sidste Viking (1997) - "Plot Den Sidste Viking", Moviemeter , Access date: 23 May 2022
 Den sidste viking, Scope , Access date: 23 May 2022
 Den sidste viking - Blockbuster 

1997 films
Danish children's films
Swedish children's films
Films set in the Viking Age
Films directed by Jesper W. Nielsen
Films produced by Peter Aalbæk Jensen
Zentropa films
1990s Swedish films